Lexa is a Brazilian singer and actress. Her debut album Disponível was released on September 18, 2015.

Meus Prêmios Nick

Prêmio Jovem Brasileiro

Brazilian Choice Awards

Geração Z Awards

Radio Music Awards Brasil

Capricho Awards

Brasil Music Awards

References 

Awards
Lexa